Ian Lougher (born 10 July 1963) is a Welsh motorcycle racer, noted for 8 victories in the North West 200, 10 wins at the Isle of Man TT Races and 32 wins at the Southern 100 Races in his career.

Racing career
Born in Cardiff, Lougher competed in club motor-cycle events in South Wales from 1982 until 1989. Lougher's first race was at Llandow on a Yamaha RD400, and his first race win was in 1983 at Pembrey.

After racing career
Team owner of Team ILR (Ian Lougher Racing), in 2015 his riders were Dan Hegerty in real road racing, with Vasco van der Valk and Joe Thomas in the British Motostar Championship. In 2016 Team ILR had Nadieh Jonee Schoots, Holland, in the Stock 1000 Class, with Connall Courtney, Ireland, in the Motostar standard class.

A point on the Oliver's Mount race track was named Lougher's in 2014.

Manx Grand Prix
The first race in the Isle of Man for Ian Lougher was the 1983 Manx Grand Prix in the Newcomers 350cc Junior Race. This Newcomers Race is now seen as a classic Manx Grand Prix race which was won by Robert Dunlop from Steve Hislop in 2nd place and Ian Lougher in 3rd place at an average race speed of 100.62 mph.

1983 Manx Grand Prix Newcomers Junior Race Results

A return visit by Ian Lougher for the 1984 Manx Grand Prix resulted in a broken-collar bone after a crash on the Mountain Mile while riding a 250cc Armstrong during the 1984 Junior Manx Grand Prix.

Isle of Man TT Race Career

TT victories

 * – Indicates win on the Billown Circuit.
 ** – Indicates win over 2 legs on a points scoring basis.

TT career summary

Duke Road Race Rankings

Lougher was the most successful rider in the early years of the Duke Road Racing Rankings after its inception in 2002, winning a then-record three times in 2002, 2005 and 2006. This is in part due to both Ian Lougher's international successes and his willingness to travel, competing at races all over Ireland, the Isle of Man, England, and his native Wales. Lougher's record was subsequently beaten by rival Ryan Farquhar, who went on to win the rankings a total of seven times.

References

External links

 TT database rider profile iomtt.com
 TT database TT results iomtt.com
 aberdarepark.co.uk

1963 births
Living people
Welsh motorcycle racers
Manx Grand Prix racers
Isle of Man TT riders